The eighth season of The Walking Dead, an American post-apocalyptic horror television series on AMC, premiered on October 22, 2017, and concluded on April 15, 2018, consisting of 16 episodes. Developed for television by Frank Darabont, the series is based on the eponymous series of comic books by Robert Kirkman, Tony Moore, and Charlie Adlard. The executive producers are Kirkman, David Alpert, Scott M. Gimple, Greg Nicotero, Tom Luse, and Gale Anne Hurd, with Gimple as showrunner for his fifth and final season. The eighth season received mixed reviews from critics. It was nominated for multiple awards and won two, including Best Horror Television Series for the third consecutive year, at the 44th Saturn Awards.

This season adapts material from issues #115–126 of the comic book series "All Out War Part I & II" and introduces notable comic book character Siddiq (Avi Nash). The season continues the story of Rick Grimes (Andrew Lincoln) and his group of survivors in their fight against Negan (Jeffrey Dean Morgan) and the Saviors. Rick, along with Maggie (Lauren Cohan), leading The Hilltop, and King Ezekiel (Khary Payton), leader of The Kingdom, unite forces to start a rebellion against the tyrant leader of the Saviors, initiating a war for the freedom of the communities.

Cast

Main cast

The eighth season features twenty series regulars overall. For this season, Katelyn Nacon, Khary Payton, Steven Ogg, and Pollyanna McIntosh were promoted to series regular status, after previously having recurring roles, while Seth Gilliam and Ross Marquand were added to the opening credits.

Starring
 Andrew Lincoln as Rick Grimes, the series' protagonist, a former sheriff's deputy and the leader of Alexandria, who is leading a new alliance to fight Negan and the Saviors.
 Norman Reedus as Daryl Dixon, Rick's right-hand man, the group's primary hunter and a recruiter for Alexandria.
 Lauren Cohan as Maggie Greene, the pregnant widow of Glenn and a leading figure of the Hilltop.
 Chandler Riggs as Carl Grimes, Rick's bold and courageous teenage son.
 Danai Gurira as Michonne, Rick's katana-wielding girlfriend, who acts as a mother figure to Carl and Judith.
 Melissa McBride as Carol Peletier, a fierce survivor who is spurred into fighting the Saviors as revenge for the deaths of her friends.
 Lennie James as Morgan Jones, the first survivor Rick had ever encountered, who now resides in the Kingdom and fights for his sanity.
 Alanna Masterson as Tara Chambler, a caring, witty member of the group and supply runner for Alexandria who serves as a liaison with Oceanside.
 Josh McDermitt as Eugene Porter, a timorous former member of the group whose resourcefulness leads Negan to take him under his wing.
 Christian Serratos as Rosita Espinosa, an impulsive member of the group, who is motivated to avenge her ex-boyfriend Spencer and Abraham's death.
 Seth Gilliam as Gabriel Stokes, a priest who has become hardened from his experiences with Rick's group.
 Ross Marquand as Aaron, an Alexandrian recruiter who brought Rick's group to Alexandria and is currently in the fight against the Saviors.
 Jeffrey Dean Morgan as Negan, the leader of the Saviors who serves as the season's primary antagonist.

Also starring
 Austin Amelio as Dwight, a former subordinate of Negan who now works for Rick as a double agent against the Saviors.
 Tom Payne as Paul "Jesus" Rovia, a scout for the Hilltop, that fights for the moral balance of the group.
 Xander Berkeley as Gregory, the selfish and hypocritical leader of the Hilltop whose influence diminished with Maggie's prominence.
 Khary Payton as Ezekiel, the charismatic leader of the Kingdom who allies with Rick against the Saviors.
 Steven Ogg as Simon, a former mortgage broker and Negan's second-in-command, he does not hide his intentions to overthrow Negan.
 Katelyn Nacon as Enid, a former member of Alexandria who moved to Hilltop to be with Maggie, and has formed a relationship with Carl.
 Pollyanna McIntosh as Jadis / Anne, the deceptive leader of the Scavengers who betrayed Rick's group, and maintains a neutral stance in the war.

Supporting cast

Alexandria Safe-Zone
 Jason Douglas as Tobin, the foreman of Alexandria's construction crew and member of Rick's militia.
 Jordan Woods-Robinson as Eric Raleigh, Aaron's boyfriend and his former recruiting partner, who is now a member of Rick's militia.
 Kenric Green as Scott, a supply runner in Alexandria and member of Rick's militia.
 Dahlia Legault as Francine, a member of Alexandria's construction crew and member of Rick's militia.
 Mandi Christine Kerr as Barbara, resident of Alexandria.
 Ted Huckabee as Bruce, resident and member of Alexandria's construction and member of Rick's militia.

The Hilltop
 James Chen as Kal, a guard of the Hilltop and soldier of the Hilltop's militia.
 Peter Zimmerman as Eduardo, a guard of the Hilltop and soldier of the Hilltop's militia.
 Karen Ceesay as Bertie, a resident of the Hilltop and soldier of the Hilltop's militia.
 Jeremy Palko as Andy, a resident of the Hilltop and soldier of the Hilltop's militia.
 Brett Gentile as Freddie, a resident of the Hilltop and soldier of the Hilltop's militia.
 R. Keith Harris as Dr. Harlan Carson, the doctor at the Hilltop, who was captured by Simon in the previous season.
 Ilan Srulovicz as Wesley, a resident of the Hilltop and soldier of the Hilltop's militia.
 Anthony Lopez as Oscar, a resident of the Hilltop and a soldier of Hilltop's militia.

The Saviors
 Jayson Warner Smith as Gavin, one of Negan's top lieutenants, who leads the weapons base.
 Traci Dinwiddie as Regina, one of Negan's top lieutenants.
 Elizabeth Ludlow as Arat, one of Negan's top lieutenants.
 Mike Seal as Gary, one of Negan's top lieutenants and accomplice of Simon in his plans to overthrow Negan.
 Lindsley Register as Laura, one of Negan's top lieutenants.
 Juan Pareja as Morales, a survivor from Rick's original Atlanta camp who joined the Saviors.
 Joshua Mikel as Jared, Benjamin's killer, and a hostile member of the Saviors who antagonizes Morgan.
 Callan McAuliffe as Alden, a member of the Saviors who surrenders to Jesus at the satellite station outpost.
 Lindsey Garrett as Mara, a Savior who guards one of many outposts.
 Lee Norris as Todd, a timid member of the Saviors who works at the same outpost as Mara.
 Katy O'Brian as Katy, a member of the Saviors.
 Whitmer Thomas as Gunther, a member of the Saviors who tortures Ezekiel.
 Charles Halford as Yago, a Savior who manages Gavin's weapons base.
 Ciera L. Payton as Zia, a Savior whom Rosita and Michonne encounter at a supply warehouse.
 Adam Cronan as Leo, a Savior whom Rosita and Michonne encounter at a supply warehouse.
 Chloe Aktas as Tanya, one of Negan's wives.
 Elyse Dufour as Frankie, one of Negan's wives.
 Jon Eyez as Potter, a worker for the Saviors.
 Adam Fristoe as Dean, a Savior who tried to kill Jesus.
 Matt Mangum as D.J., one of Negan's top lieutenants and guardian of the Sanctuary.
 Aaron Farb as Norris, a member of the Saviors.
 Lane Miller as Reilly, a good-hearted member of the Saviors who begins to question his side in the war.

The Kingdom
 Cooper Andrews as Jerry, Ezekiel's loyal and good-natured bodyguard.
 Kerry Cahill as Dianne, one of Ezekiel's top soldiers and a skilled archer.
 Daniel Newman as Daniel, one of Ezekiel's top soldiers.
 Carlos Navarro as Alvaro, one of Ezekiel's top soldiers.
 Macsen Lintz as Henry, a resident of the Kingdom and younger brother of the deceased Benjamin, who wants revenge on the Saviors for the death of his brother.
 Jason Burkey as Kevin, a resident of the Kingdom.
 Nadine Marissa as Nabila, a resident and gardener of the Kingdom.
 Peggy Sheffield as Dana, a doctor for the Kingdom.

Oceanside
 Deborah May as Natania, the vigilant leader of Oceanside.
 Sydney Park as Cyndie, Natania's granddaughter.
 Briana Venskus as Beatrice, one of Oceanside's top soldiers.
 Nicole Barré as Kathy, one of Oceanside's top soldiers.
 Mimi Kirkland as Rachel, an aggressive young member of Oceanside.

The Scavengers
 Sabrina Gennarino as Tamiel, a leading member of the Scavengers.
 Thomas Francis Murphy as Brion, a leading member of the Scavengers.

Miscellaneous
 Avi Nash as Siddiq, a mysterious vagabond survivor who befriends Carl.
 Jayne Atkinson as Georgie, the leader of a mysterious humanitarian group.

Production
The Walking Dead was renewed by AMC for a 16-episode eighth season on October 16, 2016. Production began on April 25, 2017, in Atlanta, Georgia. On July 12, 2017, production was shut down after stuntman John Bernecker was killed, after falling more than 20 feet onto a concrete floor. Production resumed on July 17. The season premiere, which also serves as the series' milestone 100th episode, was directed by executive producer Greg Nicotero.

In November 2017, it was announced that Lennie James who portrays Morgan Jones, would be leaving The Walking Dead after the conclusion of this season, and would join the cast of the spin-off series Fear the Walking Dead for its fourth season. The eighth season also features the departures of series regulars Chandler Riggs (Carl Grimes), Steven Ogg (Simon), and Austin Amelio (Dwight). Riggs' final episode is the mid-season premiere where his character is killed off, which is a deviation from the comic book, where his character is still alive. His death received negative reactions from critics and fans. Ogg's final episode is the penultimate episode of the season, where his character is killed by Negan. Amelio departed the series after the season finale, and in January 2019, it was confirmed he would join the cast of Fear the Walking Dead.

Episodes

Release
The first trailer for the season was released on July 21, 2017 at the San Diego Comic-Con. The second trailer was released on February 1, 2018 for the second part of the season.

On March 15, 2018, it was announced that the season finale and the fourth season premiere of Fear the Walking Dead would be screened at AMC, Regal, and Cinemark theaters across the United States on April 15, the same day as the TV airing, for "Survival Sunday: The Walking Dead & Fear the Walking Dead". The episodes marked the first crossover between the two series. The cinema screening also included an extra half-hour of exclusive bonus content.

Reception

Critical response
The eighth season of The Walking Dead received mixed reviews from critics. On Rotten Tomatoes, the season holds a score of 65% with an average rating of 6.65 out of 10 based on 17 reviews. The site's critical consensus reads: "The Walking Deads eighth season energizes its characters with some much-needed angst and action, though it's still occasionally choppy and lacking forward-moving plot progression."

Accolades

For the 44th Saturn Awards, the eight season of The Walking Dead received seven nominations, winning two. It won Best Horror Television Series and Best Performance by a Younger Actor in a Television Series (Chandler Riggs). The nominations were for Best Actor on Television (Andrew Lincoln), Best Supporting Actor on Television (Khary Payton), Best Supporting Actress on Television (Danai Gurira and Melissa McBride), and Best Guest Starring Role on Television (Jeffrey Dean Morgan).

The first half of the season was nominated for Outstanding Performance by a Stunt Ensemble in a Television Series at the 24th Screen Actors Guild Awards.

Ratings

 Live +7 ratings were not available, so Live +3 ratings have been used instead.

Home media
The eighth season was released on Blu-ray and DVD on August 21, 2018. The set includes three audio commentaries and three featurettes.

References

External links

 
 

2017 American television seasons
2018 American television seasons
08